The king genet (Genetta poensis) is a small carnivoran native to the Republic of the Congo, Equatorial Guinea, Liberia, Ghana and Côte d'Ivoire. As it has not been recorded since 1946, it is listed as Data Deficient on the IUCN Red List. It probably inhabits only tropical rainforest.

References

 
Mammals of Sub-Saharan Africa
Mammals described in 1838